Bedřich Neumann (3 April 1891 – 15 July 1964) was a Czechoslovak general. He served in the World War I and in the Czechoslovak Legions in Russia, then in the World War II he became an important member of the Obrana národa resistance organisation and chief of staff to the Czechoslovak Army in exile, gaining the nicknames "Miroslav" and "Bohuš Miroslav" whilst in exile during that conflict. After the 1948 Communist coup in Czechoslovakia he became a political exile, dying in London sixteen years later.

Life
Born in Třebichovice, he served in the World War I and then rose to the rank of Major in the Czechoslovak Legions in Russia, serving with them from 1916 to 1918. After returning to his homeland, which had become Czechoslovakia, he joined the new nation's army and held various command roles within it, culminating in that of Deputy Chief of the General Staff (1931–1935) and the rank of Brigadier General (1933). He was then put in command of 5th Division in České Budějovice (30 September 1935 – 1939).

References

External links
  Struktura Obrany národa
  PhDr. Zdeněk Vališ o Bedřichu Neumannovi
  Válka.cz, divisní generál Bedřich Neumann

Chiefs of the General Staff (Czechoslovakia)
Czechoslovak dissidents
Czech exiles
People from Kladno District
Commanders of the Order of the White Lion
Recipients of the Czechoslovak War Cross
Commanders with Star of the Order of Polonia Restituta
Honorary Knights Commander of the Order of the Bath
Officiers_of_the_Légion_d%27honneur
Commandeurs_of_the_Légion_d%27honneur
Recipients of the Legion of Merit
Recipients_of_the_Order_of_the_Yugoslav_Crown
Recipients_of_the_Croix_de_Guerre_1914–1918_(France)
Recipients_of_the_Cross of Valour (Poland)
Recipients_of_the_Order_of_St._Sava
Commanders_of_the_Order_of_the_Crown_(Romania)
Commanders of the Order of Polonia Restituta
Chevaliers of the Légion d'honneur
Recipients of the Order of the Star of Romania
Companions of the Distinguished Service Order
1891 births
1964 deaths